Medieval architecture in North America is an anachronism. Some structures in North America can however be classified as medieval, either by age or origin. In some rare cases these structures are seen as evidence on pre-Columbian trans-oceanic contact. Although much of this is pseudoscience, these buildings are of interest to American scholars of medieval architecture.

Pre-Columbian buildings
 L'Anse aux Meadows, a Norse settlement in Newfoundland. Foundations of eight structures, visible today only as mounds because they were reburied in a conservation effort. Includes modern reconstructions.
 Church of Hvalsey, a Norse church in Greenland.  Additional remains of Norse-era settlements.

Transported buildings
Medieval building that have been transported to North America in modern times.
 The Cloisters museum, New York City, a branch of the Metropolitan Museum of Art housed in a complex integrating elements from several different medieval structures
 St. Bernard de Clairvaux Church, a 12th-century cloister from Spain, reassembled in Florida
 Elements of a 12th-century cloister from Saint-Génis-des-Fontaines Abbey, a Romanesque portal, and a 15th-century chapel in the Philadelphia Museum of Art
 Part of a Romanesque cloister in the Toledo Museum of Art, Ohio
 Chapel of St Martin de Sayssuel, (St. Joan of Arc Chapel),  Marquette University, Milwaukee, Wisconsin
 Agecroft Hall, Richmond, Virginia
 Chapterhouse of the Abbey of María de Óvila, under reconstruction at the Abbey of New Clairvaux,  Vina, California
 A 1524 sidechapel from France in the Detroit Institute of Arts
 A 14th century cloister from France in the Nelson-Atkins Museum of Art
 Parts of Hearst Castle in San Simeon, California
 Parts of Hammond Castle, Gloucester, Massachusetts
 A 12th century Chapter house from France in the Worcester Art Museum, Worcester, Massachusetts

Other later period buildings were also transported like the Cotswold Cottage, built in the early 17th century in Chedworth, Gloucestershire, England, now in The Henry Ford museum in Dearborn, Michigan. The Church of St. Mary the Virgin, Aldermanbury, London, which was designed by Sir Christopher Wren in 1677 is now the National Churchill Museum in Fulton, Missouri. It includes a spiral staircase which probably dates to the 12th century.

Notes

 
Architectural history
 
Med